Aoraia aurimaculata is a species of moth of the family Hepialidae. It was described by Alfred Philpott in 1914 from a specimen collected at The Hermitage, Mount Cook by F. S. Oliver. This holotype specimen is now lost. A. aurimaculata is endemic to New Zealand, where it is found along the Southern Alps and western Fiordland in cool temperate to subalpine forests and lower penalpine shrubland.

The wingspan is 62–67 mm for males and 85–94 mm for females. Adults are on wing from February to May.

References

External links

Citizen science observations

Hepialidae
Moths of New Zealand
Endemic fauna of New Zealand
Moths described in 1914
Endemic moths of New Zealand